The 2002–03 San Jose Sharks season was the Sharks' twelfth season of operation in the National Hockey League (NHL). The Sharks placed 14th in the conference and did not qualify for the playoffs for the first time since the 1996–97 season, thus ending their five-year playoff streak. This would also be the last time the Sharks missed the playoffs until the 2014–15 season.

Offseason

Regular season
After 24 games and an 8–12–2–2 record, Darryl Sutter was fired. One game was coached by Cap Raeder before Ron Wilson, the former coach of the Washington Capitals was hired. Wilson was not able to guide the team to the playoffs and finished with a 19–25–7–6 record for the season. General manager Dean Lombardi was fired on March 18.

Captain Owen Nolan was traded to the Toronto Maple Leafs.

The Sharks' penalty kill struggled, as they finished 30th overall in penalty-kill percentage, at 81.01%.

Final standings

Schedule and results

|-  style="text-align:center; background:#fbb;"
|1||L||October 10, 2002||3–6 || style="text-align:left;"|  Detroit Red Wings (2002–03) ||Kiprusoff ||0–1–0–0 || 
|-  style="text-align:center; background:#fbb;"
|2||L||October 12, 2002||3–5 || style="text-align:left;"| @ Vancouver Canucks (2002–03) ||Kiprusoff ||0–2–0–0 || 
|-  style="text-align:center; background:#cfc;"
|3||W||October 17, 2002||4–3 || style="text-align:left;"|  Edmonton Oilers (2002–03) ||Toskala ||1–2–0–0 || 
|-  style="text-align:center; background:#fbb;"
|4||L||October 19, 2002||1–3 || style="text-align:left;"|  Colorado Avalanche (2002–03) ||Toskala ||1–3–0–0 || 
|-  style="text-align:center; background:#fbb;"
|5||L||October 21, 2002||2–5 || style="text-align:left;"|  Vancouver Canucks (2002–03) ||Kiprusoff ||1–4–0–0 || 
|-  style="text-align:center; background:#cfc;"
|6||W||October 24, 2002||2–1 || style="text-align:left;"| @ Nashville Predators (2002–03) ||Kiprusoff ||2–4–0–0 || 
|-  style="text-align:center; background:#cfc;"
|7||W||October 25, 2002||5–4 || style="text-align:left;"| @ Columbus Blue Jackets (2002–03) ||Kiprusoff ||3–4–0–0 || 
|-  style="text-align:center; background:#fbb;"
|8||L||October 27, 2002||2–3 || style="text-align:left;"| @ Chicago Blackhawks (2002–03) ||Nabokov ||3–5–0–0 || 
|-  style="text-align:center; background:#fbb;"
|9||L||October 29, 2002||2–3 || style="text-align:left;"| @ Detroit Red Wings (2002–03) ||Nabokov ||3–6–0–0 || 
|-  style="text-align:center; background:#FF6F6F;"
|10||OTL||October 31, 2002||1–2 OT|| style="text-align:left;"| @ Minnesota Wild (2002–03) ||Nabokov ||3–6–0–1 || 
|-

|-  style="text-align:center; background:#cfc;"
|11||W||November 3, 2002||4–3 || style="text-align:left;"| @ Mighty Ducks of Anaheim (2002–03) ||Nabokov ||4–6–0–1 || 
|-  style="text-align:center; background:#cfc;"
|12||W||November 5, 2002||5–2 || style="text-align:left;"|  Los Angeles Kings (2002–03) ||Nabokov ||5–6–0–1 || 
|- style="text-align:center;"
|13||T||November 7, 2002||2–2 OT|| style="text-align:left;"|  Nashville Predators (2002–03) ||Nabokov ||5–6–1–1 || 
|-  style="text-align:center; background:#fbb;"
|14||L||November 9, 2002||2–4 || style="text-align:left;"|  Minnesota Wild (2002–03) ||Nabokov ||5–7–1–1 || 
|-  style="text-align:center; background:#fbb;"
|15||L||November 11, 2002||4–5 || style="text-align:left;"|  New York Rangers (2002–03) ||Kiprusoff ||5–8–1–1 || 
|-  style="text-align:center; background:#FF6F6F;"
|16||OTL||November 13, 2002||2–3 OT|| style="text-align:left;"| @ Atlanta Thrashers (2002–03) ||Nabokov ||5–8–1–2 || 
|-  style="text-align:center; background:#fbb;"
|17||L||November 15, 2002||2–4 || style="text-align:left;"| @ Tampa Bay Lightning (2002–03) ||Nabokov ||5–9–1–2 || 
|-  style="text-align:center; background:#cfc;"
|18||W||November 16, 2002||7–3 || style="text-align:left;"| @ Florida Panthers (2002–03) ||Nabokov ||6–9–1–2 || 
|-  style="text-align:center; background:#cfc;"
|19||W||November 19, 2002||3–2 || style="text-align:left;"| @ Washington Capitals (2002–03) ||Nabokov ||7–9–1–2 || 
|- style="text-align:center;"
|20||T||November 21, 2002||2–2 OT|| style="text-align:left;"| @ Philadelphia Flyers (2002–03) ||Nabokov ||7–9–2–2 || 
|-  style="text-align:center; background:#fbb;"
|21||L||November 23, 2002||1–4 || style="text-align:left;"| @ Pittsburgh Penguins (2002–03) ||Nabokov ||7–10–2–2 || 
|-  style="text-align:center; background:#cfc;"
|22||W||November 25, 2002||4–1 || style="text-align:left;"| @ St. Louis Blues (2002–03) ||Nabokov ||8–10–2–2 || 
|-  style="text-align:center; background:#fbb;"
|23||L||November 27, 2002||2–4 || style="text-align:left;"| @ Nashville Predators (2002–03) ||Nabokov ||8–11–2–2 || 
|-  style="text-align:center; background:#fbb;"
|24||L||November 30, 2002||2–3 || style="text-align:left;"|  Phoenix Coyotes (2002–03) ||Nabokov ||8–12–2–2 || 
|-

|-  style="text-align:center; background:#cfc;"
|25||W||December 3, 2002||3–2 OT|| style="text-align:left;"| @ Phoenix Coyotes (2002–03) ||Nabokov ||9–12–2–2 || 
|-  style="text-align:center; background:#cfc;"
|26||W||December 6, 2002||3–2 || style="text-align:left;"|  Columbus Blue Jackets (2002–03) ||Nabokov ||10–12–2–2 || 
|-  style="text-align:center; background:#fbb;"
|27||L||December 7, 2002||2–4 || style="text-align:left;"|  Nashville Predators (2002–03) ||Nabokov ||10–13–2–2 || 
|-  style="text-align:center; background:#cfc;"
|28||W||December 12, 2002||5–2 || style="text-align:left;"|  Pittsburgh Penguins (2002–03) ||Nabokov ||11–13–2–2 || 
|-  style="text-align:center; background:#cfc;"
|29||W||December 14, 2002||2–0 || style="text-align:left;"|  Washington Capitals (2002–03) ||Nabokov ||12–13–2–2 || 
|-  style="text-align:center; background:#FF6F6F;"
|30||OTL||December 16, 2002||1–2 OT|| style="text-align:left;"| @ New York Rangers (2002–03) ||Kiprusoff ||12–13–2–3 || 
|-  style="text-align:center; background:#cfc;"
|31||W||December 17, 2002||3–1 || style="text-align:left;"| @ Montreal Canadiens (2002–03) ||Nabokov ||13–13–2–3 || 
|-  style="text-align:center; background:#fbb;"
|32||L||December 19, 2002||3–9 || style="text-align:left;"| @ Ottawa Senators (2002–03) ||Nabokov ||13–14–2–3 || 
|- style="text-align:center;"
|33||T||December 21, 2002||3–3 OT|| style="text-align:left;"| @ Toronto Maple Leafs (2002–03) ||Nabokov ||13–14–3–3 || 
|-  style="text-align:center; background:#fbb;"
|34||L||December 23, 2002||2–5 || style="text-align:left;"| @ Boston Bruins (2002–03) ||Nabokov ||13–15–3–3 || 
|-  style="text-align:center; background:#cfc;"
|35||W||December 26, 2002||4–1 || style="text-align:left;"|  Mighty Ducks of Anaheim (2002–03) ||Nabokov ||14–15–3–3 || 
|- style="text-align:center;"
|36||T||December 28, 2002||3–3 OT|| style="text-align:left;"|  Chicago Blackhawks (2002–03) ||Nabokov ||14–15–4–3 || 
|-  style="text-align:center; background:#cfc;"
|37||W||December 30, 2002||2–1 || style="text-align:left;"|  Philadelphia Flyers (2002–03) ||Nabokov ||15–15–4–3 || 
|-

|-  style="text-align:center; background:#fbb;"
|38||L||January 2, 2003||1–3 || style="text-align:left;"|  Dallas Stars (2002–03) ||Nabokov ||15–16–4–3 || 
|-  style="text-align:center; background:#fbb;"
|39||L||January 4, 2003||1–6 || style="text-align:left;"|  Colorado Avalanche (2002–03) ||Nabokov ||15–17–4–3 || 
|- style="text-align:center;"
|40||T||January 6, 2003||5–5 OT|| style="text-align:left;"|  Edmonton Oilers (2002–03) ||Nabokov ||15–17–5–3 || 
|-  style="text-align:center; background:#fbb;"
|41||L||January 9, 2003||1–4 || style="text-align:left;"|  St. Louis Blues (2002–03) ||Nabokov ||15–18–5–3 || 
|-  style="text-align:center; background:#cfc;"
|42||W||January 11, 2003||3–0 || style="text-align:left;"|  Vancouver Canucks (2002–03) ||Kiprusoff ||16–18–5–3 || 
|-  style="text-align:center; background:#FF6F6F;"
|43||OTL||January 13, 2003||2–3 OT|| style="text-align:left;"| @ Los Angeles Kings (2002–03) ||Kiprusoff ||16–18–5–4 || 
|- style="text-align:center;"
|44||T||January 16, 2003||2–2 OT|| style="text-align:left;"|  Buffalo Sabres (2002–03) ||Nabokov ||16–18–6–4 || 
|-  style="text-align:center; background:#fbb;"
|45||L||January 18, 2003||1–3 || style="text-align:left;"|  Dallas Stars (2002–03) ||Nabokov ||16–19–6–4 || 
|-  style="text-align:center; background:#fbb;"
|46||L||January 20, 2003||1–3 || style="text-align:left;"| @ Phoenix Coyotes (2002–03) ||Nabokov ||16–20–6–4 || 
|-  style="text-align:center; background:#FF6F6F;"
|47||OTL||January 22, 2003||4–5 OT|| style="text-align:left;"|  New Jersey Devils (2002–03) ||Kiprusoff ||16–20–6–5 || 
|-  style="text-align:center; background:#cfc;"
|48||W||January 25, 2003||4–1 || style="text-align:left;"|  Minnesota Wild (2002–03) ||Nabokov ||17–20–6–5 || 
|-  style="text-align:center; background:#cfc;"
|49||W||January 27, 2003||3–0 || style="text-align:left;"| @ Los Angeles Kings (2002–03) ||Nabokov ||18–20–6–5 || 
|-  style="text-align:center; background:#cfc;"
|50||W||January 28, 2003||3–1 || style="text-align:left;"|  Los Angeles Kings (2002–03) ||Nabokov ||19–20–6–5 || 
|-  style="text-align:center; background:#fbb;"
|51||L||January 30, 2003||3–4 || style="text-align:left;"|  Mighty Ducks of Anaheim (2002–03) ||Nabokov ||19–21–6–5 || 
|-

|-  style="text-align:center; background:#cfc;"
|52||W||February 5, 2003||6–2 || style="text-align:left;"|  Carolina Hurricanes (2002–03) ||Nabokov ||20–21–6–5 || 
|-  style="text-align:center; background:#fbb;"
|53||L||February 7, 2003||3–4 || style="text-align:left;"| @ Minnesota Wild (2002–03) ||Nabokov ||20–22–6–5 || 
|-  style="text-align:center; background:#fbb;"
|54||L||February 8, 2003||1–4 || style="text-align:left;"| @ St. Louis Blues (2002–03) ||Nabokov ||20–23–6–5 || 
|-  style="text-align:center; background:#fbb;"
|55||L||February 10, 2003||4–5 || style="text-align:left;"| @ Detroit Red Wings (2002–03) ||Nabokov ||20–24–6–5 || 
|-  style="text-align:center; background:#fbb;"
|56||L||February 12, 2003||0–1 || style="text-align:left;"| @ Columbus Blue Jackets (2002–03) ||Kiprusoff ||20–25–6–5 || 
|-  style="text-align:center; background:#cfc;"
|57||W||February 14, 2003||4–2 || style="text-align:left;"| @ Chicago Blackhawks (2002–03) ||Kiprusoff ||21–25–6–5 || 
|-  style="text-align:center; background:#fbb;"
|58||L||February 16, 2003||1–3 || style="text-align:left;"| @ Dallas Stars (2002–03) ||Kiprusoff ||21–26–6–5 || 
|-  style="text-align:center; background:#fbb;"
|59||L||February 17, 2003||2–3 || style="text-align:left;"| @ Los Angeles Kings (2002–03) ||Nabokov ||21–27–6–5 || 
|-  style="text-align:center; background:#fbb;"
|60||L||February 19, 2003||0–3 || style="text-align:left;"|  New York Islanders (2002–03) ||Nabokov ||21–28–6–5 || 
|-  style="text-align:center; background:#cfc;"
|61||W||February 21, 2003||6–0 || style="text-align:left;"|  Columbus Blue Jackets (2002–03) ||Nabokov ||22–28–6–5 || 
|-  style="text-align:center; background:#cfc;"
|62||W||February 24, 2003||5–2 || style="text-align:left;"|  Calgary Flames (2002–03) ||Nabokov ||23–28–6–5 || 
|-  style="text-align:center; background:#cfc;"
|63||W||February 27, 2003||3–2 || style="text-align:left;"| @ Vancouver Canucks (2002–03) ||Nabokov ||24–28–6–5 || 
|-

|-  style="text-align:center; background:#fbb;"
|64||L||March 1, 2003||3–4 || style="text-align:left;"| @ Calgary Flames (2002–03) ||Nabokov ||24–29–6–5 || 
|-  style="text-align:center; background:#fbb;"
|65||L||March 4, 2003||1–2 || style="text-align:left;"| @ Edmonton Oilers (2002–03) ||Kiprusoff ||24–30–6–5 || 
|-  style="text-align:center; background:#cfc;"
|66||W||March 6, 2003||4–3 OT|| style="text-align:left;"|  Montreal Canadiens (2002–03) ||Kiprusoff ||25–30–6–5 || 
|-  style="text-align:center; background:#fbb;"
|67||L||March 8, 2003||4–6 || style="text-align:left;"| @ Phoenix Coyotes (2002–03) ||Nabokov ||25–31–6–5 || 
|-  style="text-align:center; background:#fbb;"
|68||L||March 9, 2003||0–3 || style="text-align:left;"| @ Dallas Stars (2002–03) ||Kiprusoff ||25–32–6–5 || 
|-  style="text-align:center; background:#fbb;"
|69||L||March 11, 2003||2–4 || style="text-align:left;"|  St. Louis Blues (2002–03) ||Kiprusoff ||25–33–6–5 || 
|-  style="text-align:center; background:#FF6F6F;"
|70||OTL||March 13, 2003||2–3 OT|| style="text-align:left;"| @ Mighty Ducks of Anaheim (2002–03) ||Kiprusoff ||25–33–6–6 || 
|-  style="text-align:center; background:#cfc;"
|71||W||March 15, 2003||3–2 || style="text-align:left;"|  Calgary Flames (2002–03) ||Toskala ||26–33–6–6 || 
|-  style="text-align:center; background:#FF6F6F;"
|72||OTL||March 17, 2003||2–3 OT|| style="text-align:left;"|  Chicago Blackhawks (2002–03) ||Toskala ||26–33–6–7 || 
|-  style="text-align:center; background:#fbb;"
|73||L||March 20, 2003||0–2 || style="text-align:left;"| @ Colorado Avalanche (2002–03) ||Kiprusoff ||26–34–6–7 || 
|-  style="text-align:center; background:#cfc;"
|74||W||March 21, 2003||3–2 || style="text-align:left;"|  Boston Bruins (2002–03) ||Toskala ||27–34–6–7 || 
|-  style="text-align:center; background:#FF6F6F;"
|75||OTL||March 22, 2003||2–3 OT|| style="text-align:left;"|  Mighty Ducks of Anaheim (2002–03) ||Nabokov ||27–34–6–8 || 
|-  style="text-align:center; background:#fbb;"
|76||L||March 24, 2003||1–4 || style="text-align:left;"|  Tampa Bay Lightning (2002–03) ||Nabokov ||27–35–6–8 || 
|-  style="text-align:center; background:#cfc;"
|77||W||March 27, 2003||3–0 || style="text-align:left;"|  Detroit Red Wings (2002–03) ||Toskala ||28–35–6–8 || 
|-  style="text-align:center; background:#fbb;"
|78||L||March 29, 2003||3–4 || style="text-align:left;"|  Dallas Stars (2002–03) ||Toskala ||28–36–6–8 || 
|-  style="text-align:center; background:#fbb;"
|79||L||March 31, 2003||1–3 || style="text-align:left;"| @ Colorado Avalanche (2002–03) ||Nabokov ||28–37–6–8 || 
|-

|- style="text-align:center;"
|80||T||April 2, 2003||2–2 OT|| style="text-align:left;"| @ Calgary Flames (2002–03) ||Nabokov ||28–37–7–8 || 
|- style="text-align:center;"
|81||T||April 3, 2003||3–3 OT|| style="text-align:left;"| @ Edmonton Oilers (2002–03) ||Toskala ||28–37–8–8 || 
|- style="text-align:center;"
|82||T||April 6, 2003||3–3 OT|| style="text-align:left;"|  Phoenix Coyotes (2002–03) ||Nabokov ||28–37–9–8 || 
|-

|-
| Legend:

Player statistics

Scoring
 Position abbreviations: C = Center; D = Defense; G = Goaltender; LW = Left Wing; RW = Right Wing
  = Joined team via a transaction (e.g., trade, waivers, signing) during the season. Stats reflect time with the Sharks only.
  = Left team via a transaction (e.g., trade, waivers, release) during the season. Stats reflect time with the Sharks only.

Goaltending

Awards and records

Awards

Milestones

Transactions
The Sharks were involved in the following transactions from June 14, 2002, the day after the deciding game of the 2002 Stanley Cup Finals, through June 9, 2003, the day of the deciding game of the 2003 Stanley Cup Finals.

Trades

Players acquired

Players lost

Signings

Draft picks
San Jose's draft picks at the 2002 NHL Entry Draft at the Air Canada Centre in Toronto, Ontario.

Notes

See also
2002–03 NHL season

References

San
San
San Jose Sharks seasons
San Jose Sharks
San Jose Sharks